The Ninepin Bowling Classic Singles World Cup was a biennial nine-pin bowling competition organized by the World Ninepin Bowling Association (WNBA NBC). The World Cup was started in 1989 and until 2003 took place every year. The next one was held in 2004 and take place biennially since then.

The formula of the competition has changed many times. Since 2003, it has been played in the KO system. Since 2005 games for the 3rd place were not played, but two bronze medals were awarded. Since 2009, the World Cup was held simultaneously with the U23 World Cup.

The 2023 edition was the last held. Due to changes in the WNBA-NBC calendar, the World Cup will be replaced with the European Championship.

List of championships

Medal count

List of hosts 
List of hosts by number of competitions hosted.

References

 
Recurring sporting events established in 1989
Recurring sporting events disestablished in 2023